Nicholas Biddle (September 10, 1750 – March 7, 1778) was one of the first five captains of the Continental Navy, which was raised by the Continental Congress during the American Revolutionary War. Biddle was born in Philadelphia in 1750. He began sailing at the age of 13 and joined the Royal Navy when he was 20. In 1773, he sailed the Arctic with Constantine Phipps and Horatio Nelson. When the Revolutionary War began in 1775, Biddle joined the Continental Navy and commanded several ships. In 1778 off the coast of Barbados, Biddle confronted , a 64-gun British warship. After a twenty-minute battle, Biddle's ship  suddenly exploded, killing him and most of his men. Four ships of the U.S. Navy have been named in his honor.

Early life
Nicholas Biddle was born in Philadelphia in 1750, one of nine children to William Biddle (1698–1756) of the Biddle family, and Mary Scull (1709–1789). Biddle went to sea at the age of thirteen, as a ship's boy aboard a merchant vessel trading to the West Indies. In 1770 he joined the Royal Navy and served three years until resigning in 1773 to accompany Captain Constantine Phipps on his expedition to the Arctic Sea. While on this voyage Biddle became acquainted with Horatio Nelson, the future British admiral and fellow member of Phipps' expedition.

American Revolutionary War
In 1775 Biddle returned to North America to offer his services to the State of Pennsylvania in opposing British rule. With the outbreak of the American Revolutionary War, the Pennsylvania Committee of Safety placed Biddle in command of the armed galley . In December 1775, Biddle was commissioned into the Continental Navy and made captain of the 14-gun brig .

Biddle was highly critical of the action, noting that the lack of signalling by Commodore Esek Hopkins led to a "helter skelter" action. Biddle would later capture numerous vessels, including British army transports, on later cruises.

Biddle later participated in a cruise of the Newfoundland Banks that was so successful in the taking of ships, that when Biddle returned to port he had only five sailors left on board his ship; the rest were crewing the prizes taken during the cruise.

On June 6, 1776, Biddle was appointed by the Continental Congress to command , a 32-gun frigate then being built in Philadelphia. She was launched near the close of the year, and sailed early in 1777. In September 1777, Biddle captured  and her three-ship convoy.

On March 7, 1778, off Barbados, Randolph engaged the British 64-gun ship of the line . Rather than trying to flee from the more heavily armed opponent, Randolph engaged in battle in order to protect an American merchant convoy. An eyewitness reported the frigate held her own in the twenty-minute engagement, appearing, "to fire four or five broadsides to the Yarmouths one."  After Biddle was wounded, Randolph blew up suddenly, killing all but four of the 305 on board including Biddle. The loss of Randolph was a serious blow to the fledgling Continental Navy. His body was lost at sea and never recovered.

His brother, Edward Biddle, was a staunch advocate for American independence, and his nephew, Nicholas Biddle, was an esteemed banker.

Four ships of the United States Navy have been named  in his honor.

Cyrus Townsend Brady's book For Love of Country is based partly on the life of Nicholas Biddle.

In popular culture 
Nicholas Biddle appears in the video game Assassin's Creed III as the primary target of the Naval Missions and the templar captain of  during the American Revolution. He is voiced by Fred Tatasciore.

References

Bibliography

 
 

1750 births
1778 deaths
Nicholas
Captains who went down with the ship
Continental Navy officers
Military personnel from Philadelphia
United States military personnel killed in the American Revolutionary War
People of colonial Pennsylvania
People of Pennsylvania in the American Revolution
Royal Navy officers